The "psychology of previous investment" was coined by James Howard Kunstler to describe the sunk costs of the modern urban/suburban lifestyle.  It is the reluctance to abandon technologies and standards of urban infrastructure into which humans have already made substantial investments, and is seen as a major contributor to modern energy crises.

See also
Abandonment cost
Sunk cost fallacy

References 

The Psychology of Previous Investment - Raise the Hammer
PetroCollapse New York Conference; October 5, 2005 - Remarks on the subject from Kunstler's website

Investment